In baking and pastry making, streusel is a crumbly topping of flour, butter, and sugar that is baked on top of muffins, breads, pies, and cakes. Some modern recipes add spices and chopped nuts. The mixture can also be layered or ribboned in the middle of a cake.

Some baked dishes which have a streusel topping are streuselkuchen, coffee cake, babka, and apple crisp.

The term is also sometimes used for rich pastries topped with, or mixed with, streusel.

Etymology
From German  ("something scattered or sprinkled"), from the verb  (cognate with the English verb strew).

See also
 Soboro-ppang
 Crumble

References

Alsatian cuisine
American desserts
Ashkenazi Jewish cuisine
German pastries
Jewish baked goods
Toppings